Lick Creek is a stream in Stoddard County in the U.S. state of Missouri. It is a tributary of the St. Francis River which it enters within the Otter Slough Conservation Area.

Lick Creek was so named on account of a mineral lick near its course.

See also
List of rivers of Missouri

References

Rivers of Stoddard County, Missouri
Rivers of Missouri